Platinum Collection is a studio album by Rossa, and is a repackaging of the album The Best of Rossa. This album is special for Pecinta Rossa (Rossa fans) in Indonesia, because it added a new song which was never released by Rossa on her albums in Indonesia, Aku Bersahaja and  Ku Pinang Kau Dengan Bismillah. This album was released on June 18, 2013 by Trinity Optima Production and  Gramedia Bookstore Indonesia.

Album track list 
 "Aku Bersahaja" (duet with Taufik Batisah)
 "Tak Sanggup Lagi"
 "Ku Pinang Kau Dengan Bismillah" (duet with Ungu)
 "Ku Menunggu"
 "Terlanjur Cinta" (duet with Pasha)
 "Pudar"
 "Aku Bukan Untukmu"
 "Ayat-Ayat Cinta"
 "Hati Yang Kau Sakiti"
 "Tegar"
 "Kini"
 "Atas Nama Cinta"
 "Memeluk Bulan"
 "Jangan Ada Dusta Di Antara Kita" (duet with Broery)
 "Perawan Cinta"

Sources
 http://sport.detik.com/aboutthegame/read/2013/07/11/182705/2299939/228/rossa-luncurkan-album-platinum-collection
 http://www.republika.co.id/berita/senggang/musik/13/07/12/mpsk2j-20-tahun-berkarier-rossa-luncurkan-platinum-collection
 http://entertainment.seruu.com/read/2013/07/12/173965/20-tahun-berkarir-rossa-luncurkan-album-platinum-collection

2013 albums
Rossa (singer) albums